Ostkaka,  meaning "cheese" and  meaning "cake" in Swedish, also known as Swedish cheesecake or Swedish curd cake, is a Swedish dessert that has its roots in two different parts of Sweden, Hälsingland and Småland, though there are some differences between ostkaka from Hälsingland resembling halloumi in texture, and the soft-grained ostkaka from Småland.

The dish is usually eaten lukewarm with a jam or cordial sauce, typically cloudberry, cherries, raspberry, or strawberry, though lingonberry is not uncommon; as well as fruits, cream or, more rarely, ice cream.

Despite the similarity in literal translation, ostkaka should not be confused with cheesecake. Swedes typically call the latter by its English name, sometimes making it "American cheesecake", to avoid confusion. Even so, Scandinavian restaurant menus sometimes confuse the two.

Traditional recipes
Ostkaka is traditionally produced by adding rennet to a warm milk and flour mixture and letting the casein coagulate.
It is then baked in an oven, and gently reheated before serving.
It should be served warm - never hot, as this will nullify some of its flavor.

Hälsingeostkaka
This is only made with the base ingredients, with local variations being some cream or sugar added, but regardless less sweet than the other kind.
The press-strained curd is further pressed into a baking dish and baked at medium heat until fully set. Whether it should receive a fine coat of saffron or not is still up for heated debate. 
When cold, it can be stored until serving, at which time it is sliced and reheated in the oven in a bath of cream until it just begins to boil. By the time it is served, the heat should have evened out through the dish to perfect temperature.

Smålandsostkaka
Cream, sugar, eggs, almonds and bitter almond are added to the curd, which is strained but not pressed, to create a batter that then is poured into the baking dish.
Traditionally, the Småland variety is cooked in a large copper pot. This is said given rise to a tradition of allowing guests to take their portions from the centre of the Ostkaka, thereby avoiding any traces of copper that may have leached into the mixture where it is in contact with the pot.
Said as often is that the centre is the creamiest and most succulent, and thus more suited to offer the guests.
Either way, the dish is baked to the consistency of scrambled eggs before taken out.

Simplified recipes
Since the process of curdling milk is somewhat complicated, alternative recipes intended for home cooking instead use fresh cheese as a base to simulate the texture of the dessert.

National Day
Since 2004, the "Day of Ostkaka" is celebrated on November 14 in Sweden. It was established and is promoted by Ostkakans vänner ("Friends of Ostkaka"), a non-profit organization founded in 2003.

Similar curd cake recipes are also found in America and Russia, often under the name "Angel Tears" curd cake.

See also

 Fatost
 List of cakes
 List of desserts

References

Swedish desserts
Almonds
Cheese dishes
National dishes